The 1951 Liège–Bastogne–Liège was the 37th edition of the Liège–Bastogne–Liège cycle race and was held on 22 April 1951. The race started and finished in Liège. The race was won by Ferdinand Kübler.

General classification

References

1951
1951 in Belgian sport
1951 Challenge Desgrange-Colombo